Gura Văii may refer to several places in Romania:

Gura Văii, a commune in Bacău County
Gura Văii, a village in Pleșcuța Commune, Arad County
Gura Văii, a village in Podari Commune, Dolj County
Gura Văii, a village in Albota Commune, Argeș County
Gura Văii, a village in Racova Commune, Bacău County
Gura Văii, a village in Scorțoasa Commune, Buzău County
Gura Văii, a village in Recea Commune, Brașov County
Gura Văii, a village in Sudiți Commune, Ialomița County
Gura Văii, a village in Strunga Commune, Iași County
Gura Văii, a village attached to Drobeta-Turnu Severin city, Mehedinți County
Gura Văii, a village in Girov Commune, Neamț County
Gura Văii, a village in Câmpuri Commune, Vrancea County
Gura Văii, a village in Stănilești Commune, Vaslui County
Gura Văii, a village in Bujoreni Commune, Vâlcea County
Gura Văii (river), a tributary of the Pruteț in Vaslui County